Monsieur Basket (literally: Mr Basketball) is a nickname that may refer to:

 Alain Gilles (1945–2014), French basketball player and coach
 Jean Raynal (1929–2015), French sports journalist